The 1993–94 Cypriot Third Division was the 23rd season of the Cypriot third-level football league. Othellos Athienou FC won their 1st title.

Format
Fourteen teams participated in the 1993–94 Cypriot Third Division. All teams played against each other twice, once at their home and once away. The team with the most points at the end of the season crowned champions. The first team were promoted to 1994–95 Cypriot Second Division. The last five teams were relegated to the 1994–95 Cypriot Fourth Division.

The 2nd-placed team faced the 9th-placed team of the 1993–94 Cypriot Second Division, in a two-legged relegation play-off for one spot in the 1994–95 Cypriot Second Division. The 9th-placed team faced the 2nd-placed team of the 1993–94 Cypriot Fourth Division, in a two-legged relegation play-off for one spot in the 1994–95 Cypriot Third Division.

Point system
Teams received three points for a win, one point for a draw and zero points for a loss.

League standings

Promotion playoff 
Achyronas Liopetriou 1 – 2 Doxa Katokopias FC
Doxa Katokopias FC 4 – 1 Achyronas Liopetriou

Relegation playoff 
Rotsidis Mammari 2 – 1 Fotiakos Frenarou
Fotiakos Frenarou 1 – 0 Rotsidis Mammari

Sources

See also
 Cypriot Third Division
 1993–94 Cypriot First Division
 1993–94 Cypriot Cup

Cypriot Third Division seasons
Cyprus
1993–94 in Cypriot football